"Three Little Fishies", also known as "Three Little Fishes", is a 1939 song with words by Josephine Carringer and Bernice Idins and music by Saxie Dowell. The song tells the story of three fishes, who defy their mother's command of swimming only in a meadow, by swimming over a dam and on out to sea, where they encounter a shark, which the fish describe as a whale. They flee for their lives and return to the meadow in safety.

The song was a US No. 1 hit for Kay Kyser and His Band in 1939. It was released  in the UK as a 78 by British comedian Frankie Howerd, on the short-lived UK Harmony label, in 1949. It was revived in 2012 by Ray Stevens for inclusion in his 108-song box set, The Encyclopedia of Recorded Comedy Music.

Other recordings
 A recording was made in 1939 by Nat Gonella and The Georgians. It features in the compilation Children's Wartime Favourites, issued in 2005 by River Records.
 On February 11, 1953 Spike Jones and his City Slickers recorded a version of the song featuring George Rock imitating the high voice of a little child.
 In 1961, Buzz Clifford released a version of the song as a single which reached #102 on the Billboard pop chart.
 In 1963, The Andrews Sisters recorded it on their Dot Records album “Greatest Hits Volume 2”, although they never recorded it prior to this album.
 In 1966 Jon Pertwee contributed the song to the children's album Children's Favourites by EMI and Paul Hamlyn.
 The 1973 made-for-television movie Birds of Prey features the original version of the song at its introduction, being sung along to by protagonist David Janssen while flying a Hughes 500 helicopter for a fictional Salt Lake City radio station. Later incarnations of the film, on formats such as VHS and DVD, have the song omitted and substituted by another big band song of indeterminable title.
 1980: in episode 17 of the 4th season of The Muppet Show, the song is sung by a Muppet eel, performed by Jerry Nelson, with Muppet fishes and a shark.
 In a 1981 episode of Three's Company, a misunderstanding occurs when Jack and Janet overhear a psychiatrist, played by Jeffrey Tambor, repeatedly saying "boom, boom, dittum dattem..." while trying to remember the words to this song, to help him get through to a patient. Jack and Janet mistake him for the mental patient and fear for Terri's safety on their date.
 In "Force of Habit", the 15th episode of the 1982-1983 television show Tales of the Gold Monkey, the main character, an ex-Flying Tiger named Jake Cutter, played by Stephen Collins, sings the song in the middle of a storm to keep up morale in his plane.
 In two episodes of Barney & Friends, A Splash Party Please from 1992 and Look at me, I'm 3! from 1993, the children perform the song with Barney and Baby Bop.
 There is a version on the 1963 Homer and Jethro album Zany Songs of the 30s.
 A portion of the song was used by Mitch Ryder and The Detroit Wheels, in 1966, as part of their version of The Marvelettes' "Too Many Fish in the Sea".
 Ray Walston and the Do Re Mi Children's Chorus recorded a version of the song in 1965.
 It has also been recorded in other languages, including Dutch and Norwegian (as "Har du hørt historien om de tre små fisk").
 The Kidsongs Kids, Professor Majorchord, and Dr. Smithsonian perform this song on Kidsongs: Play Along Songs, although the third verse is omitted.
 During her 1969 appearance on the Here’s Lucy episode “Lucy and the Andrews Sisters”, Patty Andrews sings this song during a medley of Andrews Sisters hits.
 In 1995, this song was performed in Mickey's Fun Songs: Beach Party at Walt Disney World.
 Canadian children's singers Sharon Lois and Bram recorded the song for their 1984 LP "Mainly Mother Goose"
 Cocomelon Season 5 Episode 1 features the melody of the song although the lyrics are changed to, "Down In The Jungle."

See also
 Nonsense song

References

External links
 Lyrics at lyricsfreak.com
 : Frankie Howerd - "Three Little Fishes" / "I'm Nobody's Baby" (1949)

1939 songs
1939 singles
1961 singles
Songs written by Saxie Dowell
Mildred Bailey songs
American children's songs
Ray Stevens songs
Buzz Clifford songs
Columbia Records singles
Songs about fish